Butea is a genus of flowering plants belonging to the pea family, Fabaceae. It is sometimes considered to have only two species, B. monosperma and B. superba, or is expanded to include four or five species.

Butea monosperma is used for timber, resin, fodder, herbal medicine, and dyeing.

Butea is also a host to the lac insect, which produces natural lacquer.

Taxonomy
Butea is named after John Stuart, 3rd Earl of Bute (1713-1792), member of parliament, prime minister for one year, and a patron of botany. William Roxburgh erected the genus Butea in 1795, but it became a nomen invalidum. Carl Willdenow validated the name Butea in 1802.

Uses 
Butea monosperma, called kiṃśukha in Sanskrit, is used in Ayurvedic medicine to treat various symptoms.

Species
Forty-two names have been published in Butea, but forty of these are either synonyms or names of species that have been transferred to other genera.

 B. braamiana
 B. buteiformis (Megalotropis buteiformis, Meizotropis buteiformis)
 B. monosperma (syn. Butea frondosa, Erythrina monosperma): flame-of-the-forest, bastard teak, pâlāsh
 B. superba (Plaso superba, Rudolphia superba)

References

External links
 
 
 Erythrina monosperma In: Encyclopédie Méthodique. Botanique

Phaseoleae
Fabaceae genera